William H. Stayton (1861-1953) was an attorney and former US Navy officer who founded the Association Against the Prohibition Amendment in 1918 and served as chairman of its board of directors.

Stayton and the Association played an important role in bringing about the repeal of prohibition in the U.S. (1933).

Stayton authored the Naval Militiaman's Handbook (1895).

References

Prohibition in the United States
American activists
1861 births
1953 deaths